Saint Ann South Eastern is a parliamentary constituency represented in the House of Representatives of the Jamaican Parliament. It elects one Member of Parliament MP by the first past the post system of election. The seat is considered a safe seat for the People's National Party.

Boundaries 

The constituency covers the communities of Claremont, Calderwood, Bensonton and Moneague. It is currently represented by former Miss World, Lisa Hanna.

References

Parliamentary constituencies of Jamaica